Fayçal Nini (born 10 August 1986 in Armentières) is a French football player of Algerian descent who last played for Nea Salamina. He started his career for the reserves of Lille OSC.

External links
Profile at francefootball.fr
 https://www.youtube.com/watch?v=oxUm5XnYegg
 https://www.youtube.com/watch?v=4Jonj-pi3MU

1986 births
Living people
French footballers
Cypriot First Division players
Lille OSC players
Nea Salamis Famagusta FC players
French expatriate footballers
Expatriate footballers in Cyprus
French sportspeople of Algerian descent
French expatriates in Cyprus
Association football midfielders
People from Armentières
Sportspeople from Nord (French department)
Footballers from Hauts-de-France